is the theatrical superhero film adaptation of the Super Sentai series' Juken Sentai Gekiranger television tokusatsu drama directed by Shōjirō Nakazawa and written by Naruhisa Arakawa. It premiered in Japanese theaters on August 4, 2007 with the Kamen Rider Series' film Kamen Rider Den-O: I'm Born!. The movie's title comes from the Cantonese pronunciation of Ni hao (Mandarin for "hello"), as Cantonese is the de facto dialect of Hong Kong.

Plot
While in the middle of fighting, the Gekirangers and Mere are teleported to Hong Kong, along with Rio and various other martial artists around the world. Just as Rio and Jyan were about to fight, they meet the mysterious Lao Fan before seeing others brought to the island as well. The first round of fighting leaves the Gekirangers, their Rinjūken rivals, Lao, Barnard Koyama, and Big the Goto as the winners. At the banquet hall, Ran, Retu, Rio, and Mere meet Yang Lo himself while Jyan follow Lao Fan and learns she's actually a member of the Hong Kong police who is investigating Yang, who founded Mechung Fu and used his tournament to gather strongest fighters as part of his plan to rule the world, finding the ideal Ki he needs: from the Jūken users. Geki Blue, Geki Yellow, Rio, and Mere attempt to fight off Miranda as Yang takes his leave, finding Jyan and Lao in his base of operations before they restrained him. However, the Ki Miranda collected before she died transfers to Yang's computer, transforming Yang into a cyborg Beastman before he starts absorbing more Ki to become a supreme being. The Gekirangers battle Yang Lo, refusing to give up in spite of him being stronger than them. Evading his defeat, Yan activates his giant robot Mechannon to terrorize the city. When GekiTohja proves no match for Mechannon, Rio and Mere take offense to Yang's comments on the Jūken style and are forced to help the Gekirangers by summoning Rin Lion and Rin Chameleon to combine with GekiTohja to form GekiRinTohja to destroy Mechannon, killing Yang in the process. Once the fight is over, in spite of the Gekirangers' amazement at the power of the united Jūken schools, Rio takes his leave with Mere telling them that nothing changed between them. The next day, Lao thanks the Gekirangers as they were about to leave for Japan when Miki, Natsume, and Xia Fu arrive for a vacation in Hong Kong.

Characters

From series
  / 
  / 
  / 
 
 
 
  /

Film only
 : A local Interpol officer who meets the Gekirangers, Rio, and Mere on Yan's island where she is trying to discover Yan's plans. She uses nunchaku to fight, like Jyan.

Mechung Fu
He uses his position to hide his true intent: gathering the Qi of the fighters as part of his plan to become the strongest being and rule the world. He succeeds and becomes a cyborg Beastman as a result. His fighting style includes , creating a sandpit to drag his opponents into. He ends up dying in Mechanon when it was destroyed by GekiRinTohja.
Form there, she uses her  to drain her opponents dry of their qi, to power Yang's transformation, getting the last amount from Rio as he killed her.
 : Robots created by Yang.

Cast
 Jyan Kandou/Geki Red: 
 Ran Uzaki/Geki Yellow: 
 Retu Fukami/Geki Blue: 
 Xia Fu (Voice): 
 Miki Masaki: 
 Natsume Masaki: 
 Rio: 
 Mere: 
 Bae (Voice): 
 Lao Fan: 
 Miranda: 
 Yang: 
 Narrator:

References

External links
Geki -Movie.jp  

Films set in Hong Kong
Films shot in Hong Kong
2000s Super Sentai films
Hong Kong martial arts films
2000s Hong Kong films